This a list of episodes for the show Bnot HaZahav.

Series Overview

Episodes

Season 1 (2011)

Season 2 (2011-12)

Season 3 (2012-13)

Season 4 (2015-16)

Season 5 (2016)

Season 6 (2016)

References 

Bnot Hazahav